The women's 5,000m T54 event at the 2008 Summer Paralympics took place at the Beijing National Stadium on 12 September. There were no heats in this event.

The final was initially held on the 8th of September but a large crash occurred with just one lap remaining. Only five of the eleven starting athletes were able to finish and, after an appeal, the IPC decided to re-run the race. Three athletes were injured in the crash and only eight started on the 12th.

Final

* Race originally held on 8 September. Crash and obstructions by race officials led to a re-run of the race.

References
 
 
 

W
2008 in women's athletics